Igor Karvaš (born 18 June 1967) is a Slovak sailor. He competed in the men's 470 event at the 1996 Summer Olympics.

References

External links
 

1967 births
Living people
Slovak male sailors (sport)
Olympic sailors of Slovakia
Sailors at the 1996 Summer Olympics – 470
Sportspeople from Bratislava